Searsia aucheri is a species of plant in the family Anacardiaceae. It is endemic to Oman.

References

aucheri
Near threatened plants
Endemic flora of Oman
Taxonomy articles created by Polbot